Alakeshwara Archaeological Site (also known as Alakeshwara Maligaya or Alakeshwara Sohona) is a historical site with archaeological ruins, situated in Sri Jayawardenepura Kotte, Western province, Sri Lanka. The site has been formally recognised by the Government as an archaeological protected monument in Sri Lanka.

The site consists of two rectangular shaped building foundations, built out of Kabok stones. The two foundations are located close to each other and assumed to be the palace ruins of King Nissanka Alagakkonara (Alakeshwara), who was a minister of King Vikramabahu III of Gampola.
Architectural features and the artifacts found from the site, such as grinding stones and water filters collaborate the assumption that the site is the palace of Alakeshwara. However this site is also known as the mausoleum (tomb) of Alakeshwara, but there is no conclusive evidence to substantiate this claim.

See also
Kingdom of Kotte

References

External links
 Sri Lanka Telecom Pura Varuna - Alagakkonara Palace

Buildings and structures in Sri Jayawardenepura Kotte
Tourist attractions in Western Province, Sri Lanka
Archaeological protected monuments in Colombo District